Sandra Moral Ventosinos (born 28 November 1991) is a Spanish racing cyclist, who currently rides for Spanish UCI Women's Continental Team .

References

External links

1991 births
Living people
Spanish female cyclists
Place of birth missing (living people)